Graham Day (22 November 1953 – 8 February 2021) was an English professional footballer who played as a central defender. Active in both England and the United States, Day made 262 career league appearances. He died in 2021.

Career
Born in Bristol, Day began his career in 1974 with Bristol Rovers of the Football League. Between 1974 and 1979, Day made 130 league appearances, scoring 1 goal in the process.

Day also played in the North American Soccer League for the Portland Timbers, making a further 135 league appearances, scoring 11 goals.

References

1953 births
2021 deaths
Footballers from Bristol
English footballers
Association football defenders
Bristol Rovers F.C. players
Gloucester City A.F.C. players
Portland Timbers (1975–1982) players
English Football League players
North American Soccer League (1968–1984) indoor players
North American Soccer League (1968–1984) players
English expatriate footballers
Expatriate soccer players in the United States
English expatriate sportspeople in the United States